Seymour was an electoral district of the Victorian Legislative Assembly. It covered rural territory north of Melbourne, including the towns of Alexandra, Healesville, Kinglake, Marysville, Seymour and Yea.

It was created at the redistribution prior to the 1992 election where it was comfortably won by the Liberal's Marie Tehan who represented the comparable Legislative Council seat of Central Highlands Province from 1987 to 1992.

The seat recorded a 6.8% swing to the Labor Party at the 1996 election before being narrowly and surprisingly won by Labor's Ben Hardman due to the anti-Kennett rural backlash at 1999 election. Hardman extended his majority to 9.5% at the 2002 election and was re-elected at the 2006 election, but he was defeated by Liberal candidate Cindy McLeish at the 2010 election.

Seymour was abolished prior to the 2014 state election. Its former territory was divided between the new districts of Eildon and Euroa, as well as the pre-existing district of Yan Yean.

Members for Seymour

Election results

See also
 Parliaments of the Australian states and territories
 List of members of the Victorian Legislative Assembly

External links
 Electorate profile: Seymour District, Victorian Electoral Commission

References

1992 establishments in Australia
2014 disestablishments in Australia
Former electoral districts of Victoria (Australia)